Wilbur Lin is a Taiwanese–American conductor best known for his work with orchestras and operas in the United States and Taiwan. As of 2022, he is the music director designate of the Missouri Symphony in Columbia, Missouri and a professor at Northern Illinois University in DeKalb, Illinois. Previously, he was assistant conductor of the Cincinnati Symphony Orchestra. Lin was born in New Jersey and moved to Taiwan at age six. In 2008, while attending National Taiwan Normal University, he founded the Chamber Philharmonic Taipei. Lin has conducted ensembles in Europe, Latin America, East Asia, and the United States, including the Taipei Symphony Orchestra, Cincinnati Ballet, Manchester Camerata, and Richmond Symphony Orchestra of Indiana.

Childhood and education
Born in New Jersey, United States, Wilbur Lin moved to Taiwan at age six with his parents. His father was an amateur choir conductor. Lin has credited the musical environment at churches he attended with influencing his career choice. He was a boy soprano and began playing piano at age six.

Lin went on to study piano and harpsichord at the National Taiwan Normal University in Taipei, receiving his undergraduate degree in 2011. At school he would study with Apo Hsu, who was formerly music director of the Springfield Symphony in Springfield, Missouri-the same U.S state as the Missouri Symphony Lin would later lead. In 2013, Lin received a master of music degree in conducting from the Royal Northern College of Music in Manchester, United Kingdom. He holds a doctoral degree in orchestral conducting from Indiana University's Jacobs School of Music, where he studied with David Effron and Arthur Fagen. His dissertation is titled: Performing Bach Cantatas with Modern Orchestras: A Modern Conductor's Handbook for Applying Historically Informed Practice to Today's Ensembles. Lin has been coached by Yannick Nézet-Séguin, Mark Elder, and Helmuth Rilling and is a graduate of the Riccardo Muti's Italian Opera Academy in Ravenna, Italy.

Career
In 2008, as an undergraduate student, Lin founded the Chamber Philharmonic Taipei. Originally composed of students, the orchestra became fully professional in 2013; he continues to conduct the ensemble as of 2022. Lin was employed as assistant conductor of the Cincinnati Symphony Orchestra from 2019 to 2022. In 2022, he became an assistant professor at Northern Illinois University in DeKalb, Illinois, where he directs the University Philharmonic and Opera Theatre.

Lin becomes the third music director of the Missouri Symphony in Columbia, Missouri in 2023. He is the third Taiwanese to lead a symphony orchestra in the United States.

References

External links
Official website
The Missouri Symphony
Chamber Philharmonic Taipei

Living people
American musicians of Taiwanese descent
People from New Jersey
Taiwanese people
American male conductors (music)
21st-century American conductors (music)
National Taiwan Normal University alumni
Alumni of the Royal Northern College of Music
Jacobs School of Music alumni
Northern Illinois University faculty
Year of birth missing (living people)